Alfred Manning was a footballer who played as a forward for Port Vale and Shildon in the 1920s.

Career
Manning joined Second Division side Port Vale as an amateur in January 1920, signing professional forms the next month. He made his debut at inside-right in a 3–1 defeat to West Ham United at Upton Park on 7 February. He was never used again and instead was released from The Old Recreation Ground at the end of the season. He moved on to Shildon and then Middleton Athletic.

Career statistics
Source:

References

English footballers
Association football forwards
Port Vale F.C. players
Shildon A.F.C. players
English Football League players
Year of birth missing
Year of death missing